"I Feel Immortal" is a song by Finnish singer-songwriter Tarja, featuring Canadian guitarist Jason Hook. It was written by Tarja, Toby Gad, Kerli Kõiv, and Lindy Robbins, and was produced by Tarja and "Mic". It was released as the second single from her second album What Lies Beneath on 27 August 2010.

A version recorded by Kerli under the title "Immortal" is featured on Frankenweenie Unleashed!, an album consisting of tracks from and inspired by the Tim Burton film Frankenweenie.

Background 
The song was originally written by Toby Gad, Kerli, and Lindy Robbins (who wrote Demi Lovato's "Skyscraper" the same day) for Kerli's second album but Kerli stated "it didn't make it on my album so [Tarja] rewrote some things in the verses and took our hook."

Track listing 
Regular edition
 "I Feel Immortal" (Single Mix) - 4:28
 "I Feel Immortal" (Radio Mix) - 4:31

Limited premium edition
 "I Feel Immortal" (Single Mix) - 4:28
 "If You Believe" (Piano Version) - 4:13

Credits and personnel 
 Tarja Turunen - vocals, songwriter, producer, backing vocals, piano
 Toby Gad - songwriter
 Kerli Kõiv - songwriter
 Lindy Robbins - songwriter

Credits adapted from What Lies Beneath liner notes.

Music video 
The music video was filmed in Iceland and features Tarja interacting with a character who gets older throughout the video. The video, along with the song and single, was a last-minute request from Germany. As such, it is filmed on the same beach and cliffs as the "Until My Last Breath" music video, and also features Tarja wearing the same black and white outfits. Even though it was filmed after "Until My Last Breath", the "I Feel Immortal" music video was released earlier.

Charts

Release history

References 

2010 singles
Heavy metal ballads
Songs written by Lindy Robbins
Songs written by Kerli
Songs written by Toby Gad
Tarja Turunen songs
Songs written by Tarja Turunen
2010 songs